The University of North Texas at Dallas College of Law (UNT Dallas College of Law) is a law school institution accredited by the American Bar Association (ABA). It is located at 106 S. Harwood St. in the UNT Dallas Law Center.  The parent institution is University of North Texas at Dallas (UNTD) and is the only public law school in Dallas. The first class entered in the fall of 2014. The school was originally housed in the historic Titche-Goettinger Building in downtown Dallas.

The school has been called "unconventional" in its goal of educating lawyers as public servants. The school places less emphasis on national rankings and LSAT scores in favor of students with life experiences. The school also hired faculty to focus entirely on teaching instead of legal scholarship. The school's low tuition fees have resulted in a lower acceptance rate than the national average.

As of February 2022, UNT Dallas College of Law is fully accredited by the ABA.

History 

The University of North Texas at Dallas, the first public university in the city of Dallas, was first created in 2000. The university's law school accepted its first class in 2014. The school was denied accreditation by the American Bar Association in 2016, but received provisional accreditation in 2017. Provisional status allows graduating students to take the bar exam. On February 8, 2022, the school received full approval from the American Bar Association. 

The school's founding dean was former federal district judge Royal Furgeson.

The school's initial campus was in the Titche-Goettinger Building at 1901 Main St. and then expanded in 2019 to include the nearby Dallas Municipal Building at 106 South Harwood; which the school purchased for $1. In 2015, the Texas Legislature approved a $56 million bond to pay for a renovation of the school's future campus.

The class entering in 2020 had an average LSAT score of 150 and average GPA of 3.21 for full time students.

Cost 
Cost for the 2016–2017 academic year was $15,133 for in-state students and $27,264 for out-of-state students. , UNTD was the least expensive law school in Texas, and, in 2017, had an acceptance rate of 42.26%.

Bar passage 
The first graduating class had a 59.32% passage rate for the 2017 July Bar exam, the lowest in the state. The pass rates increased to 61.18% in July 2018 and 67.61% in July 2019.

Notable faculty
 Thomas Perkins, Dallas City Attorney (2005-2013)

Notable alumni
 Darryl Morris, NFL cornerback and free agent who signed with the San Francisco 49ers, New York Giants, and Houston Texans.

References

External links 
 

2014 establishments in Texas
Educational institutions established in 2014
Law schools in Texas
Universities and colleges in Dallas County, Texas
Universities and colleges in the Dallas–Fort Worth metroplex
Law